Haredi cinema is a form of film production by ultra-Orthodox Jews (Haredim) in Israel from the late 20th century. Due to gender segregation in the ultra-Orthodox community, Haredi film production and viewing is segregated as well. Women's cinematic productions are often displayed in private venues while men's productions are often circulated on video cassettes and discs.

The term "Haredi cinema" refers specifically to films produced by ultra-Orthodox Jews for the ultra-Orthodox audience, as opposed to films made within the community for other communities.

References 

Films about Orthodox and Hasidic Jews